An index list of articles about the philosophy of science.

Index list

 A-series and B-series
 A New Model of the Universe
 Abductive reasoning
 Abner Shimony
 Abstinence
 Adolf Grünbaum
 Alan Turing
 Albert Einstein
 Alexandre Koyré
 Alfred Jules Ayer
 Alfred North Whitehead
 Alfred Wilm
 Alison Wylie
 Altruism
 André-Marie Ampère
 Andreas Speiser
 Androcentrism
 Anthropic principle
 Anti-Supernaturalism
 Antiscience
 Anton Kržan
 Approximation
 Archimedes
 Aristotelian physics
 Arthur Fine
 Arthur Pap
 Artificial consciousness
 Artificial intelligence
 Asa Gray
 Atomism
 Augustine Eriugena
 Avicenna
 Barry Loewer
 Bas van Fraassen
 Bayesian probability
 Behaviorism
 Berlin Circle
 Bernard d'Espagnat
 Bertrand Russell
 Biological determinism
 Biological imperative
 Blockhead (thought experiment)
 Bohr–Einstein debates
 Bonifaty Kedrov
 Boris Hessen
 C. D. Broad
 Cargo cult science
 Carl Friedrich von Weizsäcker
 Carl Gustav Hempel
 Carl Linnaeus
 Carlos Castrodeza
 Ramsey sentence
 Causality
 Centre for History and Philosophy of Science, University of Leeds
 Christopher Potter (author)
 Classical mechanics
 Classification of the sciences (Peirce)
 Claus Emmeche
 Closed circle
 Cognitive science
 Commensurability (philosophy of science)
 Computational humor
 Computer ethics
 Confirmation holism
 Conjecture
 Conjectures and Refutations
 Connectionism
 Consciousness
 Conservation biology
 Constantin Noica
 Construct (philosophy of science)
 Constructive empiricism
 Constructive realism
 Contextual empiricism
 Conventionalism
 Copernican Revolution (metaphor)

 Critical realism
 Daniel Chandler
 Data system
 David Hilbert
 David Hull (philosopher)
 David N. Stamos
 David Papineau
 David Stenhouse
 Dawkins vs. Gould
 Decision theory
 Deductive-nomological model
 Demarcation problem
 Democratic Rationalization
 Determinism
 Deterministic system (philosophy)
 Dominique Lecourt
 Don Ihde
 Ecology
 Edward Grant
 Edward Jones-Imhotep
 Edward S. Reed
 Elisabeth Lloyd
 Elliott Sober
 Emergence
 Émile Meyerson
 Empirical method
 Empirical relationship
 Empirical research
 Empiricism
 Entity realism
 Epicurus
 Epistemological anarchism
 Epistemological rupture
 Epistemology
 Eric Higgs (philosopher)
 Ernest Nagel
 Ernst Mach
 Ernst W. Mayr
 Ervin László
 Erwin Schrödinger
 Ethics of artificial intelligence
 Ethics of technology
 Ethics of terraforming
 Eugenics
 Evelyn Fox Keller
 Evolution
 Evolutionary epistemology

 Evolutionary psychology
 Experiment
 Experimenter's bias
 Explanation
 Explanatory gap
 Explanatory power
 Eyewitness testimony
 Fact, Fiction, and Forecast
 Faith, Science and Understanding
 Falsifiability
 Faraday Institute for Science and Religion
 Fatalism
 Federico Cesi
 Francis Bacon
 Frank P. Ramsey
 Frederick Suppe
 Friedrich Kambartel
 Friedrich von Hayek
 Friedrich Waismann
 Friedrich Wilhelm Joseph Schelling
 Fringe science
 Fritjof Capra
 Functional contextualism
 Galileo Galilei
 Game theory
 Gaston Bachelard
 Genidentity
 Geoffrey Hellman
 Geohumoral theory
 Gerald Holton
 Gerard Verschuuren
 Gerd Buchdahl
 God of the gaps
 Great chain of being
 Greedy reductionism
 Gunther Stent
 Gustav Bergmann
 Hans Hahn
 Hans Reichenbach
 Harvey Brown (philosopher)
 Helen Longino
 Henri Poincaré
 Henry Margenau
 Henry Moyes
 Herbert Feigl
 Herbert Spencer
 Heroic theory of invention and scientific development
 Hilary Putnam
 History and philosophy of science
 History of evolutionary thought
 History of the Church–Turing thesis
 Horror vacui (physics)
 Hossein Nasr
 Hugh Everett III
 Hugo Dingler
 Ian Hacking
 Ignoramus et ignorabimus
 Ilkka Niiniluoto
 Immunology
 Implications of nanotechnology
 Imre Lakatos
 Indeterminacy (philosophy)
 Individual
 Inductive reasoning
 Inductivism
 Infinite regress

 Information ethics
 Institute for Ethics and Emerging Technologies
 Instrumentalism
 Intentionality
 Internalism and externalism
 International Network of Engineers and Scientists for Global Responsibility
 Internet ethics
 Introspection
 Ionian Enlightenment
 Irreversibility
 Is logic empirical?
 Isaac Newton
 Jakob Friedrich Fries
 James G. Lennox
 James Robert Brown
 Jean Cavaillès
 Jerome Ravetz
 Jerzy Giedymin
 Jesús Mosterín
 Joachim Jungius
 John Beatty (philosopher)
 John Bulwer
 John Earman
 John L. Pollock
 John Lennox
 John Searle
 John von Neumann
 John Weckert
 John Worrall (philosopher)
 Jordi Pigem
 Joseph Henry Woodger
 Jules Vuillemin
 Jürgen Mittelstraß
 Karl Jaspers
 Karl Popper
 Kinetic theory of gases
 Kurt Riezler
 Kyle Stanford
 Larry Laudan
 Leonardo Moledo
 Lindley Darden
 List of philosophers of science
 Logical positivism
 Louis Rougier
 Luddite
 Ludwik Fleck
 Mariano Artigas
 Mario Bunge
 Marx W. Wartofsky
 Mary Hesse
 Mary Tiles
 Matteo Campani-Alimenis
 Mauricio Suarez
 Max Bense
 Max Black
 Maxwell's demon
 Measurement in quantum mechanics
 Mechanism (philosophy)
 Mediocrity principle
 Meera Nanda
 Methodological individualism
 Michael Oakeshott
 Michael Ruse
 Michael Scriven
 Michel Bitbol
 Miura Baien
 Models of scientific inquiry
 Modern Physics and Ancient Faith
 Molecular biology
 Molyneux's Problem
 Moravec's paradox
 Moritz Schlick
 Multiple discovery
 Myth of Progress
 Naïve empiricism
 Nancy Cartwright (philosopher)
 Natural law
 Natural philosophy
 Natural selection
 Nature (philosophy)
 Neo-Luddism
 Neuroethics
 Neuroscience
 Neven Sesardic
 Newton's flaming laser sword
 Newtonianism
 Niels Bohr
 Noam Chomsky
 Norman Swartz
 Norwood Russell Hanson
 Not even wrong
 Novum Organum
 Objectivity (science)
 Observation
 Occam's razor

 Operational definition
 Operationalization
 Otto Neurath
 Oxford Calculators
 Paradigm
 Paradigm shift
 Parsimony
 Particle physics
 Paul Feyerabend
 Paul Häberlin
 Perception
 Percy Williams Bridgman
 Peripatetic axiom
 Pessimistic induction
 Peter Achinstein

 Phenomenalism
 Philip Kitcher
 Philip Mirowski
 Philipp Frank
 Phillip H. Wiebe
 Philosophers of science
 Philosophical interpretation of classical physics
 Philosophy of artificial intelligence
 Philosophy of biology
 Philosophy of chemistry
 Philosophy of computer science
 Philosophy of economics
 Philosophy of engineering
 Philosophy of information
 Philosophy of mathematics
 Philosophy of physics
 Philosophy of psychology
 Philosophy of science
 Philosophy of Science Association
 Philosophy of social science
 Philosophy of space and time
 Philosophy of statistics
 Philosophy of technology
 Philosophy of thermal and statistical physics
 Physical law
 Physicalism
 Physics envy
 Pierre Duhem
 Pierre Gassendi
 Popper's experiment
 Popper and After
 Positivism
 Post-positivist
 Pragmatism
 Prediction
 Principle of uniformity
 Probability
 Problem of induction
 Pseudoscience
 Psychological nominalism
 Psychologism
 Ptolemy
 Quantity
 Quantum field theory
 Quantum indeterminacy
 Quantum logic
 Quantum mechanics
 R. B. Braithwaite
 Raimo Tuomela
 Ramsey–Lewis method
 Rational reconstruction
 Reasonable doubt
 Received view of theories
 Reductionism
 Regulation of science
 Relationship between religion and science
 Religious interpretations of the Big Bang theory
 René Descartes
 Retrocausality
 Richard Boyd
 Richard Swinburne
 Robert Grosseteste
 Robert Kilwardby
 Roberto Refinetti

 Roboethics
 Roger Bacon
 Roger Penrose
 Rose Rand
 Rudolf Carnap
 Sandra Mitchell
 Science
 Science and Christian Belief
 Scientific Communism
 Scientific essentialism
 Scientific law
 Scientific misconduct
 Scientific modelling
 Scientific progress
 Scientific realism
 Scientific revolution
 Scientific theory
 Scientism
 Scientistic materialism
 Scientists for Global Responsibility
 Semantic view of theories
 Sense data
 Sherrilyn Roush
 Social constructionism
 Space
 Spacetime
 Species
 Stephen Mulhall
 Stephen Toulmin
 Steve Fuller (sociologist)
 Structuralism (philosophy of science)
 Supervenience
 Susan Oyama
 Taketani Mitsuo
 Technocriticism
 Technological determinism
 Technological Somnambulism
 Technorealism
 Temporal finitism
 The Incoherence of the Philosophers
 The Logic of Scientific Discovery
 The Relativity of Wrong
 The Selfish Genius
 The Structure of Scientific Revolutions
 The Two Cultures
 The Value of Science
 Theoretical definition
 Theory
 Theory choice
 Thomas Samuel Kuhn
 Thucydides
 Time
 Uncertainty principle
 Unified Science
 Uniformitarianism
 Unity of science
 Universe
 Varadaraja V. Raman
 Verificationism
 Verisimilitude
 Victor Kraft
 Victoria Institute
 Vienna Circle
 Voodoo science
 Werner Heisenberg
 Wesley C. Salmon
 What Is This Thing Called Science?
 Whitny Braun
 Wilhelm Windelband
 Wilhelm Wundt
 Willard Van Orman Quine
 Willem B. Drees
 William Irwin Thompson
 William Newton-Smith
 William W. Tait
 William Whewell
 Wolfgang Smith
 Wolfgang Stegmüller
 Wronger than wrong
 Xu Liangying
 Yoichiro Murakami
 Zen and the Art of Motorcycle Maintenance

See also

 List of philosophers of science
 :Category: Philosophy of science

External links
 

.Index
Science
philosophy